Mount Wasilewski is a prominent isolated mountain (1,615 m) located 9 nautical miles (17 km) east-southeast of Merrick Mountains in Palmer Land. First seen and photographed from the air by Ronne Antarctic Research Expedition (RARE), 1947–48. Named by Advisory Committee on Antarctic Names (US-ACAN) for Peter J. Wasilewski, member of the University of Wisconsin parties which explored this area in the 1961-62 and 1965–66 seasons.

Mountains of Palmer Land